Christelle Guignard (born September 27, 1962 in Les Deux Alpes) is a retired French alpine skier. She competed at the 1984, 1988 and the 1992 Winter Olympics.

Doping ban 
Guignard came third in the giant slalom at the FIS Alpine World Ski Championships 1989 in Vail, but her doping sample was found positive for nikethamide and she lost the bronze medal. She was also banned from sport for 1 year.

World Cup victories

References

External links
FIS profile

1962 births
Living people
Doping cases in alpine skiing
French sportspeople in doping cases
French female alpine skiers
Alpine skiers at the 1984 Winter Olympics
Alpine skiers at the 1988 Winter Olympics
Alpine skiers at the 1992 Winter Olympics
Olympic alpine skiers of France